The Nieuport-Delage NiD 43 was a single-engine, two-seat biplane fighter aircraft designed and built for shipboard use in France in 1924.

Design and development
The NiD 43 was designed to meet a naval requirement for a two-seat shipborne fighter. It was a two bay biplane, with unswept, constant chord, unstaggered wings braced by parallel pairs of interplane struts. There were ailerons on the lower wings alone. Its fuselage was flat sided, with two open cockpits.  The pilot sat in the forward one under the wing trailing edge, where there was a cut-out to enhance his upward view, and the gunner was positioned close behind with a pair of Lewis machine guns mounted on a prominent ring. The tail was conventional, with a tailplane mounted on top of the fuselage and braced with two parallel struts on each side, a broad fin with a curved leading edge and a deep, straight edged rudder.

The NiD 43 was powered by a  Hispano-Suiza 12Hb water cooled upright V-12 engine in the nose, which drove a four blade propeller. The undercarriage was unusual; although it was expected that the aircraft would fly from an aircraft carrier, the probability of emergency water landings was recognised.  Consequently, the NiD 43 was fitted with both wheels and floats.  The latter were short and stepless, each attached to the aircraft by two short pairs of N-form struts. They reached well ahead of the wing leading edge but ended just aft of the trailing edge, too short to support the rear fuselage which instead was made watertight and floated the machine in a tail down traditional landing position. This allowed surface taxiing with the propeller clear of the water.  There were fixed wheels recessed into the floats below the wing mid-chord, which on ship formed a conventional undercarriage, tail down again, with the short floats clearing the deck.

The NiD 43 began flight testing in 1924 and went the following year to Saint-Raphaël, Var for competitive evaluation by the Aéronavale. At the end of the assessment the Levasseur PL.5 was preferred and ordered, when development of the Nieuport ceased.

Specifications

References

Biplanes
Floatplanes
1920s French fighter aircraft
 043
Carrier-based aircraft
Single-engined tractor aircraft